The EADS 3 Sigma Nearchos is a medium distance reconnaissance unmanned aerial vehicle (UAV) introduced in 1996, one of several UAVs developed by the Greek 3 Sigma (since 2002 EADS 3 Sigma) aerospace company, in collaboration with Greek universities.

Uses

Military
 Battlefield surveillance
 Aerial reconnaissance
 Target acquisition
 Damage assessment
 ESM/ECM
 Communication data relay

Civilian
 Geological and maritime applications
 Traffic surveillance
 Localization of polluted areas and natural disaster areas
 Border and forestry patrolling
 Forest fire detection

Specifications (Nearchos)

Further development was terminated after the company went out of business in 2012.

See also

External links/References 
Company website (archived)

Airbus Defence and Space aircraft
Unmanned military aircraft of Greece